PQ 14 can refer to :

Convoy PQ 14, an Arctic convoy of the Second World War
Culver PQ-14, an American light aircraft of the 1940s